Sourcebooks, Inc., is an independent book publisher located in Naperville, Illinois. The company publishes books, ebooks, and digital products, and is one of the 20 largest publishers in the United States.

History
The company was founded in 1987 by Dominique Raccah as a business and finance publisher. Raccah cashed in $17,000 from her retirement fund to start the press. The company expanded into other categories of trade publishing. As of 2010, they had 54 apps in development. By 2015, the publisher had 120 employees, working on a diverse list of adult, children's, and young adult books, in addition to its rapidly expanding e-commerce businesses. As of 2010, they were the largest woman-owned book publisher in the United States.

In 2013, the publisher launched a personalized book engine with its "Put Me In The Story" application and website. It added brands such as Sesame Street, the Berenstain Bears, and Hello Kitty, in addition to authors and illustrators such as Nancy Tillman. Later additions to Put Me In The Story included Curious George and characters from Disney and Nickelodeon, among others. In 2013, Sourcebooks acquired motivational and inspirational book publisher Simple Truths. The company reported a 20% gain in sales in 2014, with particular gains from its Sourcebooks Jabberwocky children's imprint and Sourcebooks Fire young adult imprint. The results also included sales of more than two million picture books by Marianne Richmond.

In December 2016, Raccah was named book publishing's "Person of the Year" by Publishers Weekly, a book publishing trade magazine. In February 2017, Publishers Weekly reported NPD BookScan data showing Sourcebooks as the 18th-largest trade publisher in America. Sourcebooks published 385 titles in 2017 and was the 14th-largest trade publisher in the U.S. In 2018, Sourcebooks acquired mystery imprint Poisoned Pen Press. The following year, Penguin Random House acquired 45% of Sourcebooks, with the company forming a new management board that included Penguin Random House executives.

Imprints 
 Sourcebooks (adult nonfiction)
 Sourcebooks Landmark (fiction) 
 Sourcebooks Casablanca (romance fiction) 
 Cumberland House (gift, cookbooks, and history) 
 Simple Truths (business, leadership, motivation, and inspiration) 
 Sourcebooks Fire (young adult) 
 Sourcebooks Kids
Sourcebooks Wonderland (specialized)
Sourcebooks Jabberwocky (children)
Sourcebooks Young Readers (middle grades)
Sourcebooks eXplore (nonfiction)
 Poisoned Pen Press (mystery)
 Bloom Books (romance)

References

External links 

Companies based in Naperville, Illinois
Publishing companies established in 1987
Book publishing companies based in Illinois